Ealdred may refer to:
 Ealdred of Hwicce, 8th-century king of Hwicce
 Ealdred I of Bamburgh, 10th-century ruler of Bamburgh
 Ealdred (archbishop of York), 11th-century English ecclesiastic
 Ealdred II of Bamburgh, 11th-century ruler of Bamburgh

See also
 Aldred